Texas's 4th congressional district of the United States House of Representatives is in an area of Northeast Texas, that includes some counties along the Red River northeast of the Dallas/Fort Worth Metroplex, as well as some outer eastern suburbs of the Metroplex. Austin College in Sherman, Texas is located within the district. As of 2017, the 4th district represents 747,188 people who are predominantly white (80.8%) and middle-class (median family income is US$56,062, compared to $50,046 nationwide).
It is currently represented by Pat Fallon.

District
All or portions of the following counties are in the 4th congressional district since 2023:
Bowie County (part)
Collin County (part)
Delta County
Denton County (part)
Fannin County
Grayson County
Hopkins County
Hunt County (part)
Lamar County
Rains County
Red River County (part)
Rockwall County

History
Texas has had at least four congressional districts since the State's senators and representatives were re-seated in Congress after the Civil War. The district's current configuration is dated from 1903. It has traditionally given its congressmen very long tenures in Washington; only six men have represented it since then.

Once a reliably Democratic district, the district swung rapidly into the Republican column at the federal level as Dallas' suburbs spilled into the western portion of the district. In fact, it has not supported a Democrat for president since 1964. However, as late as 1996, Bill Clinton carried ten of the sixteen counties that are currently in this district; many of those counties were in the 1st district at the time. Additionally, conservative Democrats continued to hold most of the district's local offices well into the 2000s.

For many years, it was based in Tyler, but a controversial 2003 redistricting orchestrated by then-House Majority Leader Tom DeLay drew it and neighboring Longview out of the 4th district and into neighboring 1st, which made it significantly more Republican. In the process, the 4th district was pushed slightly to the north, picking up Texarkana from the 1st district.

Ralph Hall, the one-time dean of the Texas congressional delegation, represented the district from 1981 to 2015. Originally a Democrat, he became a Republican in 2004. Hall's voting record had been very conservative—even by Texas Democratic standards—which served him well as the district abandoned its Democratic roots. By the turn of the century, he was the only elected Democrat above the county level in much of the district. He had been rumored as a party switcher for some time, and many experts believed he would almost certainly be succeeded by a Republican once he retired.

In 2014, Hall was defeated in the Republican primary by John Ratcliffe, who had served as the former United States Attorney for much of the 4th's territory, and was additionally the former mayor of Heath—a city coincidentally located near Hall's hometown of Rockwall. No Democrat even filed, though by this time, the district had become so heavily Republican that any Democratic candidate would have faced nearly impossible odds in any event. Underlining just how Republican this district was, the Democrats have only managed as much as 30% of the vote once since Hall's party switch.

In January 2015, Ratcliffe took office, and became only the fifth person to hold the seat. He ran unopposed for reelection in 2016, and defeated a nominal Democratic challenger in 2018.

In May 2020, Ratcliffe resigned his seat ahead of his swearing-in to become the 6th Director of National Intelligence.

The district's best-known congressman was Sam Rayburn, the longtime Speaker of the House.

President Dwight D. Eisenhower was born in the fourth district.

2012 redistricting
After the 2012 redistricting process, a large portion of Collin County had been removed, and replaced with the portion of Cass County that had been in Texas's 1st congressional district, all of Marion County, and a large portion of Upshur County.

Election results from recent presidential races

List of members representing the district 

The district was created in 1869, one of two new districts that Texas gained after the 1860 Census, but was not filled due to the Civil War and Reconstruction.

Recent elections

2004

2006

2008

2010

2012

2014

2016

2018

2020

2022

Historical district boundaries

See also
List of United States congressional districts

References

 Congressional Biographical Directory of the United States 1774–present

04
Collin County, Texas
Cass County, Texas
Jefferson, Texas
Marion County, Texas
Rains County, Texas
Rockwall County, Texas
Upshur County, Texas